Mikhail Golosov is a Belarusian-American economist currently the Homer J. Livingston Professor of Economics at the University of Chicago and a Fellow of the Econometric Society. He previously served as Chemical Bank Chairman's Professor of Economics at Princeton University.

Education

Golosov earned a bachelor's degree in economics and banking from Belarus State Economic University in 1998. After graduation, he completed his master's degree in University of British Columbia in 1999. Finally, he was able to get a Doctor of Philosophy in economics from University of Minnesota in 2004.

Teaching Experiences

Golosov was an Assistant Professor with the title of Dornbusch Career Development Associate Professor at MIT from 2004 to 2009. He was a professor at Yale University from 2009 to 2011. He was a professor with the title of Chemical Bank Chairman's Professor of Economics at Princeton University from 2011 to 2017. Finally, he is continuing the Homer J. Livingston Professor of Economics at the University of Chicago as stated above. Also, he had a lot of experiences as a visiting professor at Kellogg School of Management and Harvard University.

Teaching Courses

These are some teaching courses from Professor Golosov based on his CV, and he mainly focused on teaching about Public Finance and some courses related to Macroeconomics as well.

University of Chicago: ECON33100 (Theory of Income), ECON26010 (Introduction to Public Finance), ECON36000 (Public Finance)

Northwestern University: ECON309 (Element of Public Finance), ECON436 (Public Finance)

Princeton University: ECON341 (Public Finance), ECON523 (Graduate Public Finance)

Yale University: ECON511b (Macroeconomics), ECON790 (Political Economy)

Harvard University: ECON2410c (Advanced Macroeconomics)

MIT: 14.472 (Public Finance), 14.453 (Macroeconomics), 14.462 (Advanced Macroeconomics), 14.128 (Dynamic Programming), 14.102 (Mathematics for Economists)

References

External links 
 Bio The University of Chicago

Year of birth missing (living people)
Living people
Princeton University faculty
MIT School of Humanities, Arts, and Social Sciences faculty
21st-century American economists
University of Minnesota College of Liberal Arts alumni
University of British Columbia alumni
Fellows of the Econometric Society
Belarusian economists
Belarus State Economic University alumni